Norbert Katz (9 November 1900 – 1979) was an Austrian footballer. He played in three matches for the Austria national football team in 1921.

References

External links
 

1900 births
1979 deaths
Austrian footballers
Austria international footballers
Place of birth missing
Association footballers not categorized by position